The Hampshire Senior Cup is a cup competition open to football teams affiliated with the Hampshire Football Association. The competition was founded in 1887 and has been contested every year since, with the exception of 1914 to 1919 when it was postponed due to the First World War.

Despite the name, teams from Wiltshire, Dorset, the Isle of Wight and the Channel Islands have also competed in this competition, as well as teams representing the Police and any armed forces based within the county. The competition is open to teams from all levels of competition from the Premier League down to Level 10 of the English football league system, and a number of league teams have won this competition in the past. However, it is mostly non-league clubs who compete for this trophy instead of their league counterparts as all teams associated with the Hampshire FA are required to compete, with the exception of Premier League and English Football League teams who may opt out of the competition for a nominal fee.

The record attendance came in the 1932 Final, when an incredible 20,544 watched Newport play Cowes at The Dell, Southampton. The biggest score in the final came more recently in 2000 when Aldershot Town defeated Andover 9–1. There has also twice been 8–0 final scores.

The current champions are Farnborough, who defeated Eastleigh FC 4-1 on penalties (after a 2-2 score line in normal time), in the 2022 final held at Ten Acres.

In April 2012, FIFA announced that the Hawk-Eye sensor system would be used in an experimental capacity at that year's final between A.F.C. Totton and Eastleigh as part of a series of ongoing reliability and accuracy tests of goal-line technology systems.

On 9 October 2013, a tie was played between Brockenhurst and Andover Town. After the match finished 0-0 after extra time, the subsequent penalty shootout resulted in 29 consecutive goals being scored, with Brockenhurst winning 15–14. This was later confirmed by the Football Association as an English record (and possibly a world record) for the highest number of consecutive goals scored in a penalty shootout.

Winners

By team

By year

References

External links
 Hampshire Senior Cup at the Hampshire F.A. website

Football in Hampshire
County Cup competitions
Recurring sporting events established in 1887